You Know I Can't Hear You When the Water's Running is a collection of four unrelated one-act comedy plays by Robert Anderson.

In The Shock of Recognition, playwright Jack Barnstable auditions Richard Pawling for a role that requires nudity and discovers the overeager actor is more than willing to show his stuff. The Footsteps of Doves focuses on Harriet and George, a married couple shopping for twin beds after many years of marriage. George, who is opposed to the change, strikes up a conversation with Jill, a considerably younger fellow shopper who shares his view. In I'll Be Home for Christmas, Chuck and Edith realize how empty their marriage has become as they await the arrival of their adult children. I'm Herbert is a scattered conversation between Herbert and Muriel, an elderly couple with memory problems who try in vain to recall their earlier relationships.

After 15 previews, the original Broadway production opened on March 13, 1967 at the Ambassador Theatre. It transferred twice, to the Broadhurst Theatre and then the Lunt-Fontanne Theatre, before it completed its run of 756 performances on January 4, 1969.

Directed by Alan Schneider, the opening night cast included Eileen Heckart, Martin Balsam, George Grizzard, and Melinda Dillon. Replacements later in the run included Larry Blyden, Irene Dailey, and William Redfield.

Costume design was by Theoni V. Aldredge and lighting design was by Jules Fisher.

Balsam won the Tony Award for Best Performance by a Leading Actor in a Play. Schneider was nominated for the Tony Award for Best Direction of a Play but lost to Mike Nichols for Plaza Suite.

Productions

Original Production 
First presented by Jack Farren and Gilbert Cates at the Ambassador Theatre in New York City on March 13, 1967 with the following cast:

The Shock of Recognition
Jack Barnstable .... Joe Silver
Herb Miller .... George Grizzard
Richard Pawling .... Martin Balsam
Dorothy .... Melinda Dillon

The Footsteps of Doves
Salesman .... George Grizzard
Harriet .... Eileen Heckart
George .... Martin Balsam
Jill .... Melinda Dillon

I'll be Home for Christmas
 Chuck .... Martin Balsam
 Edith .... Eileen Heckart
 Clarice .... Melinda Dillon

I'm Herbert
Herbert .... George Grizzard
Muriel ....Eileen Heckart

This production was directed by Alan Schneider, with scenery designed by Ed Wittstein, costumes by Theoni V. Aldredge, and lighting by Jules Fisher

Other Productions

Agentura Harlekýn 
From Prague's theatre of Agency Harlekýn. Directed by Pavel Háša.
Poznání šokem (The Shock of Recognition)
Herb Miller .... Petr Nárožný
Jack Barnstable .... Jiří Ptáčník
Richard Pawling .... Václav Vydra
Dorothy .... Dana Morávková or Eva Janoušková

Stopy Holubic (The Footsteps of Doves)
Harriet .... Libuše Švormová
George .... Jiří Ptáčník
Jill .... Dana Morávková or Eva Janoušková
Shopassistant .... Václav Vydra

Já jsem Herbert (I'm Herbert)
Herbert .... Petr Nárožný
Muriel .... Květa Fialová

Career Launches 
The creators of the soon-to-debut The Mary Tyler Moore Show were having challenges finding the right actor for the role of anchorman Ted Baxter. A Mary Tyler Moore Show producer happened to see Ted Knight perform in You Know I Can't Hear you When the Water's Running at the Gallery Theater in California. Based on his performance, Knight was brought in to audition for, and was eventually cast as, Ted Baxter.

References

External links
 
  (archive)

1968 plays
Plays by Robert Woodruff Anderson
Broadway plays
Comedy plays